The Mehlis Report may refer to:

Mehlis report, United Nations' investigation into the 2005 assassination of Lebanon former prime minister Rafik al-Hariri
The Mehlis Report (book), Labanese novel about the report